Richard Gifford (1725–1807), was an English poet and Church of England clergyman.

Life and career
He was born at Bishop's Castle, Shropshire. He was educated at Oxford University where he gained his degree in theology in 1748.  Ordained in holy orders in the Church of England, he was appointed curate at Richard's Castle, Herefordshire and was later a preacher in Soho, London.

Literary works
He was the author of a poem, Contemplation. He also wrote theological and controversial works.

References

External links

1725 births
1807 deaths
Clergy from Shropshire
18th-century English Anglican priests
Alumni of the University of Oxford
English male poets
Writers from Shropshire